List of events in 2018 in esports (also known as professional gaming).

Calendar of events

Tournaments

References

 
Esports by year